The 1873 United States Senate election in New York was held on January 21, 1873, by the New York State Legislature to elect a U.S. Senator (Class 3) to represent the State of New York in the United States Senate.

Background
Republican Roscoe Conkling had been elected in January 1867 to this seat, and his term would expire on March 3, 1873.

At the State election in November 1871, 21 Republicans and 11 Democrats were elected for a two-year term (1872-1873) in the State Senate. In 1872, a faction of the Republican Party opposed the re-election of President Ulysses S. Grant and the Radical Republicans who supported him, and under the name Liberal Republican Party nominated a joint ticket with the Democratic Party. At the State election in November 1872, 91 Republicans, 35 Democrats and 2 Independents were elected for the session of 1873 to the Assembly. The 96th New York State Legislature met from January 7 to May 30, 1873, at Albany, New York.

Candidates

Republican caucus
The caucus of Republican State legislators met on January 8, State Senator William B. Woodin, of Auburn (25th D.), presided. 18 state senators and 88 assemblymen were present. They re-nominated the incumbent U.S. Senator Conkling unanimously.

Democratic caucus
The caucus of the Democratic State legislators nominated Ex-First Judge of Dutchess County Charles Wheaton.

Result
Roscoe Conkling was the choice of both the Assembly and the State Senate, and was declared elected.

Notes: 
The vote for Ex-U.S. Attorney General Evarts was cast by Norman M. Allen (32nd D.), the vote for Ex-Judge of the New York Court of Appeals Selden by Gabriel T. Harrower (27th D.). Allen, Harrower and Abiah W. Palmer (11th D.) were the three Liberal Republicans in the State Senate.
The votes were cast on January 21, but both Houses met in a joint session on January 22 to compare nominations, and declare the result.

Aftermath
Conkling was re-elected in 1879, and remained in office until May 17, 1881, when he resigned in protest against the distribution of federal patronage in New York by President James A. Garfield without being consulted. The crisis between the Stalwart and the Half-Breed factions of the Republican party arose when the leader of the New Yorker Half-Breeds William H. Robertson was appointed Collector of the Port of New York, a position Conkling wanted to give to one of his Stalwart friends.

See also 
 United States Senate elections, 1872 and 1873

Notes

Sources
Members of the 43rd United States Congress
ALBANY.; Unanimous Nomination of Roscoe Conkling for U.S. Senator in NYT on January 9, 1873
ALBANY.; Nomination of Roscoe Conkling as United States Senator in NYT on January 22, 1873
The Life and Letters of Roscoe Conkling: Orator, Statesman and Advocate by Alfred R. Conkling (page 449) [gives wrong date for governor's inauguration "January 6", the inauguration happens invariably on January 1; and adds non-existent middle initial "G."]

1873
New York
United States Senate